Fantu Worku Taye (born 29 March 1999) is an Ethiopian middle-distance runner specialising in the 1500 metres. She won the silver medal at the 2016 World U20 Championships. She represented her country at the 2017 World Championships narrowly missing the semifinals.

At the 2018 Anniversary Games in London, she stopped racing half a lap early after sprinting to first place, mistaking the quarter mile line as the finish line and then proceeding to stop running once crossing it.

International competitions

Personal bests

Outdoor
1500 metres – 4:05.81 (London 2017)
Indoor
1500 metres – 4:08.56 (Ostrava 2017)
3000 metres – 8:50.36 (Eaubonne 2017)

References

1999 births
Living people
Ethiopian female middle-distance runners
World Athletics Championships athletes for Ethiopia
Ethiopian Athletics Championships winners
21st-century Ethiopian women